Goldfinch Tavern is a New American restaurant in Seattle's Central Waterfront, in the U.S. state of Washington.

Description
Housed in the Four Seasons Hotel, the Goldfinch Tavern is a Pacific Northwest-focused, New American restaurant operated by chef Ethan Stowell. The dinner menu has included oysters, hamachi and geoduck crudo, king crab, Penn Cove mussels, ricotta ravioli with local porcini mushrooms, and wild king salmon. The restaurant has also served crab cakes, pastas, quail, and Wagyu burgers.

History
The restaurant opened in June 2015.

See also 

 List of New American restaurants

References

External links

 
 Goldfinch Tavern at Ethan Stowell Restaurants
 Goldfinch Tavern at Zomato

2015 establishments in Washington (state)
Central Waterfront, Seattle
New American restaurants in Seattle
Restaurants established in 2015